The second season of The Walking Dead, an American post-apocalyptic horror television series on AMC, premiered on October 16, 2011, and concluded on March 18, 2012, consisting of 13 episodes. Developed for television by Frank Darabont, the series is based on the eponymous series of comic books by Robert Kirkman, Tony Moore, and Charlie Adlard. It was executive produced by Darabont, Kirkman, Glen Mazzara, David Alpert, and Gale Anne Hurd, with Mazzara assuming the role of showrunner after Darabont's departure from the series.

The season was well received by critics. It won Best Television Presentation at the 38th Saturn Awards and Outstanding Prosthetic Makeup for a Series, Miniseries, Movie, or Special at the 64th Primetime Creative Arts Emmy Awards. The season finale was viewed by 9 million viewers, making it the highest-rated episode of the series up to that point and the most viewed episode of an original series on AMC in history, up until the premiere of the series' third season, which was watched by 10.9 million viewers.

This season adapts material from issues #7–12 of the comic book series and introduces notable comic characters Hershel Greene (Scott Wilson) and his daughter, Maggie (Lauren Cohan). Mainly set at the Greene Family Farm, after the escape and destruction of the CDC, the season continues the story of Rick Grimes (Andrew Lincoln) and his group of survivors as they continue to survive in a post-apocalyptic world overrun by flesh-eating zombies, dubbed "walkers". After leaving Atlanta, Rick and the group are stopped on the highway by a threat unlike anything they have seen before. While searching for someone who has gone missing, the group eventually discovers an isolated farm, where tensions arise among members of the main group, and the mysterious and ignorant inhabitants of the farm, whose secrets and motives are unclear. In the midst of events, Rick and the others try to restore order after a terrible discovery as differences begin to openly erupt between Rick and Shane Walsh (Jon Bernthal).

Production

After the first season aired, Deadline Hollywood reported that series developer and showrunner Frank Darabont had let go the entire writing staff and planned to use only freelance writers for the second season. This turned out to be not entirely accurate, and Robert Kirkman was quoted as saying the changes to the writing staff would not affect the production of the show. In February 2011, it was announced that Glen Mazzara, who had written the first season episode "Wildfire", had been hired again as a writer/executive producer for the second season and will put together a staff of five more writers.

At C2E2 members of the cast confirmed that the second season would begin shooting on June 1, 2011, and that Darabont would write the season premiere episode. At the same event, cast members speculated that acclaimed author and long-time Darabont collaborator Stephen King may write an episode. Kirkman later confirmed that along with himself, Darabont and Mazzara the writing staff will consist of Scott M. Gimple, Evan Reilly, Angela Kang and one freelance writer, David Leslie Johnson. Four actors have joined the cast as new characters for season 2—Scott Wilson as Hershel Greene, Lauren Cohan as his daughter Maggie Greene, Pruitt Taylor Vince as Hershel's ranch hand, Otis, and Michael Zegen as Randall.

A preview of season 2 was shown during the fourth season premiere of Breaking Bad on July 17, 2011 and a full length trailer was released to promote season 2 at the San Diego Comic-Con on July 22, 2011.

In July 2011, Deadline Hollywood reported that Darabont stepped down from his position as showrunner for the series, amidst rumors that he was unable to adjust to the schedule of running a television series. Executive producer Glen Mazzara succeeded Darabont as showrunner for the series. Darabont's sudden departure further sparked controversy in August when The Hollywood Reporter broke a story revealing that Darabont had in fact been fired due to issues of the show's reduced budget and a strained relationship with AMC executives.

The premiere aired in an extended 90-minute time slot, similar to the pilot episode. After the first seven episodes aired, the series went on a hiatus and returned on February 12, 2012, with the final six episodes of the season airing until its conclusion on March 18, 2012.

Webisodes
Torn Apart, a six-part web series, premiered on October 3, 2011 on AMC's official website. The web series is directed by special effects makeup artist and co-executive producer Greg Nicotero and tells the origin story of Hannah, also known as "Bicycle Girl", the walker whom Rick Grimes mercy killed in the pilot episode.

Talking Dead

Following the encore presentation of the second season premiere on October 16, 2011, a live after-show titled Talking Dead, hosted by Chris Hardwick, premiered. The series airs after encore presentations of The Walking Dead on Sunday nights. It features host Chris Hardwick discussing the latest episode with fans, actors, and producers of the show.

Cast

Main cast
The second season features eight actors receiving opening credits billing, all returning from the first season; seven are listed as main cast members in the first season, while Norman Reedus and Melissa McBride were promoted from recurring status. While McBride is credited as "Also starring", she is a series regular.

Starring
 Andrew Lincoln as Rick Grimes, the series' protagonist and a former sheriff's deputy from King County, Georgia. He is the husband of Lori and the father of Carl. Rick has taken leadership from Shane after his actions almost killed them in the previous season.
 Jon Bernthal as Shane Walsh, Rick's close friend and former deputy sheriff. He had a love affair with Lori in the previous season, believing that Rick had died, which has turned into jealousy towards Rick, forming an intense rivalry. Shane is also the main antagonist of the season.
 Sarah Wayne Callies as Lori Grimes, Rick's emotionally fragile wife and mother of Carl. She had a love affair with Shane in the previous season, which has put her and Shane at odds.
 Laurie Holden as Andrea, a former civil rights attorney, who has formed a close bond with Dale. She deals with suicidal tendencies after the loss of her sister Amy by trying to contribute more to the group's safety by becoming a sharpshooter.
 Jeffrey DeMunn as Dale Horvath, an older member of the group, who owns the RV with which the group travels. He is often the voice of reason and has formed a protectiveness over Andrea. Dale becomes a mentor to the group, especially to Rick and Glenn, and is also a good friend of T-Dog.
 Steven Yeun as Glenn Rhee, a former pizza delivery boy, who saved Rick's life in the previous season. He is an integral member of the group and does many supply runs for them. Glenn cares very much for the core group of survivors.
 Chandler Riggs as Carl Grimes, Rick and Lori's young son, whose innocence has slowly declined due to the brutality of the world around him, even wanting to use a firearm.
 Norman Reedus as Daryl Dixon, an antihero-like Southern redneck, the group's hunter, and expert tracker. He is less friendly with the group and maintains a careless facade, but is reasonable enough to fight alongside them when needed and is the most active in the group for the search for Sophia.

Also starring
 Melissa McBride as Carol Peletier, a former victim of domestic abuse, who has found new strength after the death of her abusive husband Ed.

Supporting cast
 IronE Singleton as Theodore "T-Dog" Douglas, a member of the group and a man of honor, duty, and well-intentions who feels underappreciated and tries to contribute as much as possible. He also has a strong friendship with Dale.
 Lauren Cohan as Maggie Greene, Hershel's elder tomboyish daughter, who is strong-willed and determined, yet slightly stubborn. Maggie is, like her father, ignorant of what the walkers are.
 Emily Kinney as Beth Greene, Hershel's younger daughter and Maggie's half-sister. She is shy, soft-spoken and compassionate, but lacks the strong-will of her sister.
 Scott Wilson as Hershel Greene, a veterinarian and religious farmer, who is blinded by his own refusal to accept the world's new state, believing that the walkers are just sick.
 Jane McNeill as Patricia, Otis' quiet wife and Hershel's medical aid.
 James Allen McCune as Jimmy, Beth's protective and helpful boyfriend.
 Madison Lintz as Sophia Peletier, Carol's daughter and Carl's best friend.

Guest cast
 Michael Zegen as Randall Culver, a teenager, whom Rick, Glenn and Hershel encounter as part of another group.
 Pruitt Taylor Vince as Otis, Hershel's ranch hand and Patricia's husband.
 Adam Minarovich as Ed Peletier, Carol's deceased abusive husband; seen in a flashback sequence.
 Michael Raymond-James as Dave, a member of Randall's group, who runs into Rick, Glenn and Hershel.
 Michael Rooker as Merle Dixon, Daryl's violent and unreasonable older brother, who disappeared in the first season; seen in Daryl's hallucination.

Episodes

Reception

Critical response
The second season of The Walking Dead has received positive reviews from critics. On Metacritic, the season holds a score of 80 out of 100, indicating "generally favorable reviews", based on 22 critics. On Rotten Tomatoes, the season holds an 80% with an average rating of 8.05 out of 10, based on 24 reviews. The site's critical consensus reads: "The second season of The Walking Dead fleshes out the characters while maintaining the grueling tension and gore that made the show a hit." Linda Stasi of the New York Post wrote: "You'll be happy to know that at least as far as the first two episodes go ... the show is better than ever – which would have seemed impossible." Robert Bianco of USA Today also praised the direction in which the second season was heading stating that the show delivers "edge-of-your-chair tension" and also noting that "what separates this fine series from similar shows is the honesty of its human interactions".

Conversely, some critics were less enthused midway through the second season, including Ken Tucker of Entertainment Weekly who described the season as "a nighttime soap with occasional appearances by deceased but moving, flesh-rotting, flesh-eating cameo monsters" adding that it "had not been dramatic enough" or had a "tendency ... to botch truly dramatic situations". Nate Rawlings of Time magazine criticized the season's pacing, writing: "The first half of this season has been brutally slow." Following the season's finale, Scott Wampler of Collider described the second half of the season as "far more intense, more interesting, better written" despite "a helluva lot of water-treading" in the first half. Kevin Yeoman of Screen Rant further emphasized this point, writing: "It was with the last half of season 2 – arguably the last four episodes – where the writers succeeded in unshackling themselves from the intermittent monotony brought about by the serial nature of the show."

Accolades

The second season of The Walking Dead received three nominations for the 64th Primetime Creative Arts Emmy Awards, winning Outstanding Prosthetic Makeup for a Series, Miniseries, Movie, or Special (for the episode "What Lies Ahead"), and received nominations for Outstanding Sound Editing for a Series and Outstanding Special Visual Effects (both for the episode "Beside the Dying Fire").

The season also won Best Television Presentation, for the second consecutive year, at the 38th Saturn Awards, while Norman Reedus was nominated for Best Supporting Actor on Television. Additionally, the second half of the season was nominated for Outstanding Performance by a Stunt Ensemble in a Television Series at the 19th Screen Actors Guild Awards.

Ratings
On October 16, 2011, the season two premiere set a new record of 7.3 million viewers. The episode also set new records for the most viewers in the 18-49 and 25-54 demographics, with 4.8 million and 4.2 million viewers respectively, making it the most watched episode of a drama in the history of basic cable television in these measures. The original broadcast and the two subsequent encore presentations of the episode drew a collective total of 11 million viewers. On February 12, 2012, the show's mid-season premiere beat its previous record by attaining 8.1 million viewers, 5.4 million in the 18-49 key demographic, despite airing at the same time as the second most watched Grammy Awards in history. The series once again beat its own record with the airing of the season two finale on March 18, 2012, which received 9 million viewers.

Home media releases

The second season was released on DVD and Blu-ray in region 1 on August 28, 2012, in region 2 on August 27, 2012, and in region 4 on June 20, 2012. Special features include eleven featurettes—"All the Guts Inside", "Live or Let Die", "The Meat of the Music", "Fire on Set", "The Ink is Alive", "The Sound of the Effects", "In the Dead Water", "You Could Make a Killing", "She Will Fight", "The Cast on Season 2", and "Extras Wardrobe". Six audio commentaries are also featured, for episodes "What Lies Ahead", "Pretty Much Dead Already", "Nebraska", "Judge, Jury, Executioner", and "Beside the Dying Fire". Also included is the six-part webisode series The Walking Dead: Torn Apart, with optional commentary by Greg Nicotero, and 30 minutes of deleted scenes across eight episodes, with optional commentary by Glen Mazzara.

The second season was also released in a limited edition Blu-ray packaging, featuring a zombie head with a screwdriver in the zombie's eye socket, a recreation of a scene from the second season premiere. The limited edition packaging was designed by Greg Nicotero and sculpted by McFarlane Toys.

References

External links

 
 

2011 American television seasons
2012 American television seasons
02